Buzzard Coulee is the collective name of the meteorites fallen on November 20, 2008 over Saskatchewan, Canada.

History
The fireball was first spotted at around 17:30 MST (00:30 UTC) (ISO 8601 format: 2008-11-21T00:30Z) and was reported by people living in Alberta, Saskatchewan, Manitoba, and even North Dakota. It was five times as bright as a full moon. Over 400 people reported seeing it. There are several videos of the meteoroid on YouTube. The object  split into multiple pieces before widespread impact. The meteoroid entered the atmosphere at approximately 14 kilometres per second and is estimated to have been about the size of a desk and have had a mass of approximately 10 tonnes.

The village of Marsden, Saskatchewan became a hub of activity for meteorite hunters, being just south of the estimated 20 square kilometre debris field. Locals dubbed the object the "Marsden Meteor"; many of the residents reported seeing, hearing and even smelling the burning fragments as they fell. The meteor was also referred to as the "Buzzard Coulee fireball", named after the area where searchers found the first fragments.

The first pieces of the rock were found by Ellen Milley, a University of Calgary Master's student on November 27, 2008. Lone Rock, Battle River, Marsden and other names were possible candidates for the meteorite name, but the University of Calgary researchers followed the local residents' lead in officially calling the fall Buzzard Coulee, after the oldest-named geographic feature in the fall area.

In total, more than one thousand meteorite fragments have been collected from the 10-tonne fireball, among them are two  fragments. This event has set a new Canadian record for the most number of pieces recovered from a single meteorite fall.

Robert A. Haag, a famous American meteorite hunter, offered $10,000 to anyone who gave him the first one-kilogram chunk of the meteorite.

"We can see on the videos that there were three big pieces that continue here. And those aren't found yet," said Alan Hildebrand on May 4, 2009. The meteorite hunters have, however, broken a world's record for collecting over 1,000 fragments, the most ever collected from a single meteor fall.

Classification
Buzzard Coulee was classified as ordinary chondrite H4 with a shock stage S2 and a weathering grade W0.

See also

 Glossary of meteoritics

References

External links 
 Buzzard Coulee meteorite (Meteoritical Society)

2008 in Saskatchewan
Natural history of Saskatchewan
Meteorites found in Canada
Wilton No. 472, Saskatchewan